Ray Rosso (1916 - 1 December 2012) was an Italian-born American football coach and Orange Coast College's first ever football coach.  He was born in Turin, Northern Italy, in 1916 but later immigrated with his family to Oakland in California. He joined World War II and became a navy fighter pilot and flight instructor. Rosso played college football through 1938-1945 and soon became head coach at Chaffey College in San Bernardino County and won in 1946, 1947. Rosso spent his last football coach career at LeBard Stadium in 1955.

References

1916 births
2012 deaths
Italian emigrants to the United States
United States Navy personnel of World War II